Armageddon's Evolution is the second full-length album by the blackened death metal band Crionics. It was released under Candlelight Records and Empire Records in 2005. They recorded the album at Hertz Studio and was mastered by the Wiesławscy brothers.

Track listing

 "Arrival of Non-parallel Aeons" - 4:38
 "Final Inversion" - 3:17
 "Armageddon's Evolution" - 4:42
 "Chant of Rebel Angels (intro)" - 1:47
 "FFF (Freezing Fields of InFinity)" - 4:50
 "Xenomorphized Soul Devoured" - 5:27
 "Disconnected Minds" - 5:31
 "Celestial Interference" - 5:56
 "Dept. 666" ft. Adrian "Covan" Kowanek (bonus track) - 7:07
 "Black Manifest (The Sermon to the Masses)" - 4:19
 "The Loss and Curse of Reverence" - 6:09 (Bonus, Emperor cover)
 "Total Blasphemy - 3:54 (Bonus)

Total playing time 57:37

Personnel
 Michał "War-A.N" Skotniczny - guitars, vocals
 Markus "Marcotic" Kopa - bass (left during recording session)
 Maciej "Darkside" Kowalski - drums
 Wacław "Vac-V" Borowiec - keymaster

References

External links
 Encyclopaedia Metallum
 Review at Sea of Tranquility
 Metal Bite
 Hertz Studio

2005 albums
Crionics albums